Joel Eriksson (born September 16, 1984 in Göteborg) is a Swedish long track speed skater who participates in international competitions.

Personal records

Career highlights

World Sprint Championships
2007 - Hamar, 30th
European Allround Championships
2007 - Collalbo, 18th
2008 - Kolomna,  18th
2009 - Heerenveen, 13th
2010 - Hamar, 11th
World Junior Allround Championships
2003 - Kushiro, 28th
2004 - Roseville, Minnesota, 34th
National Championships
2006 - Hagaström,  1st at 1000 m sprint
2006 - Hagaström,  1st at 500 m sprint
2006 - Hagaström,  1st at sprint
2006 - Göteborg,  2nd at 1500 m
2006 - Göteborg,  3rd at 10000 m
2006 - Göteborg,  2nd at allround
2007 - Stockholm,  1st at sprint
2008 - Göteborg,  2nd at allround
Nordic Junior Games
2003 - Hamar,  2nd at 3000 m
2003 - Hamar,  3rd at 5000 m

External links
Eriksson at Jakub Majerski's Speedskating Database
Eriksson at SkateResults.com

1984 births
Living people
Swedish male speed skaters
Speed skaters at the 2010 Winter Olympics
Olympic speed skaters of Sweden
21st-century Swedish people